is a Japanese garden located next to Himeji Castle in Hyōgo Prefecture, Japan.

History 
It was constructed in 1992 at the site of the lord's west residence, to commemorate the 100th anniversary of the establishment of the Himeji municipality. In 2017, Koko-en signed a sister garden agreement  with Ro Ho En, the Japanese Friendship Garden, in its sister city, Phoenix, Arizona.

Layout 
The garden is about 3.5 hectares and has nine different gardens.

References

External links

 Kokoen Garden, Traditional Japanese Garden in Himeji City (EOK article)

Tourist attractions in Himeji
Gardens in Hyōgo Prefecture